Alvin Clifford Roseborough (c. 1910 – October 12, 1984) was a Canadian football player who played for the Regina Roughriders and Winnipeg Blue Bombers. He won the Grey Cup with Winnipeg in 1935, 1939 and 1941. He is a member of the Blue Bombers Hall of Fame as well as the Manitoba Sports Hall of Fame. He played junior football for the Saskatoon Hilltops. After his retirement he became an official in the WIFU; he was also a founder and president (on multiple occasions) of the Manitoba Officials Association. He retired as a football official in 1964. In 1958 and 1965, he was President of the Winnipeg Blue Bomber Alumni Association. He died in 1984.

References

1910s births
1984 deaths
Year of birth uncertain
Canadian football running backs
Winnipeg Blue Bombers players
Players of Canadian football from Manitoba
Canadian football people from Winnipeg